Jules Newman (born 23 February 1989) is a New Zealand rugby league footballer who played for the New Zealand Warriors in the NRL Women's Premiership. 

Background
Born in Mosgiel, Newman was a long time North Harbour representative in rugby union, winning the Farah Palmer Cup Player of the Year in 2018.

Playing career
In 2019, Newman switched to rugby league and began playing for the Mount Albert Lions in the Auckland Rugby League.

In June 2019, she was named in the New Zealand squad for their mid-season Test against Samoa but did not play. On 10 July 2019, she signed with the New Zealand Warriors NRL Women's Premiership team. In Round 1 of the 2019 NRL Women's season, she made her debut for the Warriors in a 16–12 win over the Sydney Roosters.

In October 2019, she was a member of New Zealand's 2019 Rugby League World Cup 9s-winning squad.

References

External links
NRL profile

1989 births
Living people
New Zealand female rugby league players
New Zealand women's national rugby league team players
Rugby league centres
New Zealand Warriors (NRLW) players